WFIC is a Conservative Religious formatted broadcast radio station licensed to Collinsville, Virginia, serving Martinsville and Henry County, Virginia.  WFIC is owned and operated by Grace Baptist Church.

References

External links
 WFIC Online

1970 establishments in Virginia
FIC
Radio stations established in 1970
FIC